El Divo Canta A México (The Divo sings to Mexico) is the title of a live album released by Mexican singer-songwriter Juan Gabriel on October 21, 2008. This live album was released in two formats CD and DVD.

Track listing

References

External links 
official website on Universal Music
[] El Divo Canta A México on allmusic.com

Juan Gabriel live albums
Spanish-language live albums
2008 live albums